1000 Kisses is the third studio album by Patty Griffin. It was released on April 9, 2002 on ATO Records.

Reception

The album reached a peak of number 101 on the Billboard 200 chart resulting in a number one peak on the Top Heatseekers chart. According to Billboard the album has sold 151,000 copies in the US up to May 2004. In 2009, the album was ranked #15 on Paste Magazine's "The 50 Best Albums of the Decade" list.

Track listing

Personnel
 Patty Griffin – vocals, guitar, resonator guitar, percussion, finger cymbals
 Emmylou Harris – harmony vocals on "Long Ride Home"
 Giles Reaves – drums, bells, vibraphone, djembe
 Doug Lancio – mandolin, electric & 12-string guitar
 Michael Ramos – accordion
 Kami Lyle – trumpet
 David Jacques – bass
 John Deaderick – piano
 Luis Guerra –  stand-up bass on "Mil Besos"
 Carrie Rodriguez – violin on "Mil Besos"
 Brian Standefer - cello
 David Pulkingham - classical guitar on "Mil Besos"

References

External links
 Lyrics to the album on PattyNet.net

2002 albums
Patty Griffin albums
ATO Records albums